The Swazi records in swimming are the fastest ever performances of swimmers from Eswatini, which are recognised and ratified by the Eswatini National Swimming Association.

All records were set in finals unless noted otherwise.

Long Course (50 m)

Men

Women

Short Course (25 m)

Men

Women

References

Swazi
Records
Swimming